Rikle (Ruth) Glezer (December 17, 1924 - January 12, 2006) was a World War II partisan who composed popular songs about The Holocaust during the war.

Early Life 
Glezer was born to a Jewish family in the city of Vilna, Poland, now Vilnius, Lithuania, on December 17, 1924. The daughter of a jeweler, she studied in the Yiddish Sh. Frug School of the Central Education Committee and then in a Polish School. Glezer started writing poems at the age of 12, was active in school circles, and belonged to the SKIF, the Socialist Children's Association - a Bundist Children's organization. In 1941, when she was 16-years-old, Nazi Germany occupied the city, and deported Glezer and all other Jews to the Vilna Ghetto. 

The Nazis took Glezer's father at the very beginning of the occupation. Glezer, her mother, and her younger sister lived until the liquidation of the ghetto in September 1943, and they were deported from the ghetto together. However, Glezer jumped out of the train when it was 15 kilometers from Vilna and reached the forest where she became a partisan.

Music 
Glezer wrote several songs during her years of imprisonment in the ghetto. Most of her compositions were lyrics set to the melodies of popular songs: for example, her song "My Ghetto" was composed to the tune of the Russian song "My Moscow" ("Моя Москва") by the Soviet composer Isaak Dunayevsky. Rather than depicting the beauty of Vilna, however, Glezer’s lyrics tell of the grim reality of smuggling food under conditions of disease, exhaustion and starvation.

Glezer’s best-known song was the popular "S'iz geven a zumertog" ("It Was a Summer’s Day"). The song chronicles in painful detail how Jews were driven into the Vilna ghetto, their pleas for help, and the killings that were taking place both en route to the ghetto, and in the nearby forest of Ponar. The forest of Ponar was the site of the Ponary massacre, one of the most notorious sites of Nazi mass murder, where thousands of men, women and children from Vilna and the surrounding towns were shot and buried in mass graves. The simple and evocative lyrics were set to the melody of a popular Yiddish theatre song of the inter-war years, ‘Papirosn’ (Cigarettes), composed by Herman Yablokoff. In 1999, the song was recorded and sung by Israeli singer Chava Alberstein under the name "Zumer Tag"."It was a summer's day, sunny and lovely as always/And nature then had so much charm.

Birds sang, hopped around cheerfully. We were ordered to go into the ghetto.

Oh, just imagine what happened to us! We understood: everything was lost.

Of no use were our pleas that someone should save us/We still left our home.

The road stretched far; it was difficult to walk/I think that, looking at us, a stone would have cried.

Old people and children went like cattle to be sacrificed/Human blood flowed in the street." - It was a Summer's Day, 1941.

Partisan Activities 
In 1941, when Glezer was 18, shortly after composing the song "It was a Summer's Day", Glezer was put on a train to be deported. Sources differ whether she was to be deported to Nazi camps or the forests of Ponar. Glezer managed to escape from the train, and joined the partisans in the forests surrounding Vilna. The youngest member of the partisan group, Glezer continued to write between military actions.  

Shortly after that she was deported from the ghetto to a camp. En route to Punar, the site of the Ponary massacre, she managed to jump off the train. Glazer returned to Vilina and contacted the members of the United Partisan Organization. She joined the Lithuanian partisans in the Rudniki forests south of Vilna, as a fighter in the "Death to Fascism" regiment. Between military operations, she continued to write.

She returned to Vilna with the partisans and army units that liberated the city from the Nazi forces.

After World War II 
Of the 60,000 Jews of Vilna who were alive in 1939, she was one of approximately 3,000 who survived to see the liberation of her home city by the Red Army.

In December 1948, she emigrated to Israel with her family, including her husband who was also a former partisan, on the ship Nagba. 

In 1991, a book of her poems, "Leader von Life" (Leader of the Heart, 'Songs of Life') was published by Tarklin Publishing in Tel Aviv.

In 1996, Glezer, now going by her married name Kaplan, spoke about her experience to the Survivors of the Shoah Visual History Foundation.

Known Songs 

 "My Ghetto" Du Geto Mayn -- דו געטאָ מײַן 
 Composer: Isaak Dunayevsky

 "It was a Summer's Day" Es Iz Geven A Zumertog -- עס איז געװען אַ זומערטאָג 
 Composer: Yablakoff, Herman -- יאַבלאַקאָף, הערמאַן
 Set to melody of "Papirosn"
 “It is Gray and Dark in the Ghetto" Gro un fintster iz in geto
 “The Last Night" Di letste nakht 
 “Jewish laughter" Der yidisher gelekhter 
 “I’m free" Ikh bin fray

Published Works 
 Leader of the Heart, Songs of Life. A book of poems. Tel Aviv: Lounge, 5791/1991.

Footnotes

Jewish partisans
Female resistance members of World War II
1924 births
2006 deaths
Vilna Ghetto inmates
Soviet emigrants to Israel
Jewish songwriters
Jewish women writers